Saint Edward's Primary School is an all-boys primary (elementary) school currently located at Fort Street in Freetown, Sierra Leone. Typically, it enrolls boys from ages 3 to 12. Its sister school is St. Joseph's Primary School. 

It was founded in 1866 by Roman Catholic priests from Italy, France and Ireland, and originally situated at Rawdon Street, in the area where the Sacred Heart Cathedral and Santano House are now located. It is the oldest primary school in the country and one of the oldest elementary schools in Africa. In 1922, a secondary school was also established, which became known as St. Edward's Secondary School.

House system 
The school was originally divided into several houses, named after the priests who founded or attended the school.

Fitzgerald - [Red]
St. Edward's - [Blue]
Valentine - [Green]
Ganda - [Yellow]
Brosnahan - [Orange]
Browne - [Brown]

Notable alumni 
Archbishop Joseph Ganda - first native Archbishop of Sierra Leone
Ahmad Tejan Kabbah - former President of Sierra Leone
Mohamed Kallon - Sierra Leonian soccer superstar
Sir Albert Margai - second Prime Minister of Sierra Leone
Charles Margai - Sierra Leonean lawyer and leader of the People's Movement for Democratic Change (PMDC) 

Educational institutions established in 1866
Primary schools in Sierra Leone
Catholic schools in Sierra Leone
Schools in Freetown
1866 establishments in Sierra Leone